Jimmy Vestvood: Amerikan Hero is a 2014 comedy film directed by Jonathan Kesselman and written by Maz Jobrani and Amir Ohebsion. The films stars Maz Jobrani, John Heard, Deanna Russo, Sheila Vand and Marshall Manesh. The plot follows an Iranian who wins the Green Card lottery and moves to Los Angeles with his mom to pursue his dream of becoming an American hero.

The film premiered in limited release in United States on May 13, 2016, and has grossed approximately $216,000.

Plot
Jamshid/Jimmy Vestvood (Maz Jobrani), an Iranian wannabe Private Investigator (P.I.) who lives with his mother (Vida Ghahremani), wins the Green Card lottery. As he's celebrating in his hometown Tehran, accidentally an American flag catches fire.  A video of the incident goes viral and Kox Media introduces him as a "Terrorist." After he and his mom come to United States, he realizes that he can't get any better job than a normal security guard at his family friend's shop, 'Mehdi the Butcher' (Marshall Manesh).  As he's still chasing his dream of being a P.I., and becoming an American hero like his childhood idol, Steve McQueen, he is hired by millionaire JP Monroe (John Heard).  Monroe wants Jimmy to investigate his younger wife, Marcy (Deanna Russo), whom he suspects of having an affair.  After meeting Marcy, Jimmy falls for her beauty, and starts following her around to gather evidence.  Jimmy finds out that Homayoun (Sam Golzari), Mehdi's son, is gay and is secretly dating African American Freddy. Jimmy's seventh cousin Leila (Sheila Vand), who has a big crush on him, tries to meddle.  As the plot unfolds, it becomes obvious that the Monroes want to use Jimmy for their own gain, and now Jimmy and Leila have to save the day...

From the Jimmy Vestwood website:  "The Pink Panther meets Borat in this broad satire about a bumbling yet lovable Iranian immigrant who wins the Green Card lottery and moves to Los Angeles to pursue his dream of becoming an American hero.  Jimmy Vestvood aspires to be a cool cop like his childhood idol, Steve McQueen in the movie Bullitt, but soon discovers that the best job he can get is as a security guard at a Persian grocery store.  Through a series of comically fateful events, Jimmy's naiveté is exploited when a corrupt arms dealer hires him as a private investigator. Framed as a terrorist by the fear-mongering Kox News, Jimmy is unwittingly embroiled in a conspiracy to start World War III.  With the help of his seventh cousin, Jimmy must save the day and avert the imminent war while keeping his overprotective mother in the dark.

"At a time when tensions between the East and the West are at a boiling point, “Jimmy Vestvood” playfully skewers American preconceptions of the Middle East and breaks new ground through its depiction of the first hero of Middle-Eastern descent in an American comedy."

Cast 

 Maz Jobrani as Jimmy Vestvood
 John Heard as JP Monroe
 Deanna Russo as Marcy Monroe
 Sheila Vand as Leila
 Matthew Glave as Hank Shannity
 Vida Ghahremani as Maman(Mother)
 Marshall Manesh as Mehdi the Butcher
 Waleed Zuaiter as Malek
 Matt Ballard as Karl
 Chris Williams as ICE Agent
 Sam Golzari as Homayoun
 Navid Negahban as Mohammad Mohammad-Mohammadi
 Niousha Jafarian as Homeira
 Tara Grammy as MC Iran
 Anthony Azizi as Kamal/Horny Persian
 Kareem Matthews as Freddy
 Amir K. as Stoner 1
 Dan Ahdoot as Stoner 2
 Tehran Von Ghasri  as D.J in wedding

Release 
The film went into limited released on May 13, 2016 in United States, and in its opening week grossed $61,000. It has been also released in United Arab Emirates and had grossed $54,000.

Reception

Critical response 
The film has received mixed reviews. As most notably, Washington Post's Christopher Kompanek gave it a negative 37, writing: "Teetering precariously between satire and base humor, “Jimmy Vestvood” squanders opportunities for both." On the other hand, Charles Ealy from Austin360, who enjoys the movie, writes: "The satire is well-balanced and, more often than not, the jokes go over like gangbusters. With its humorous cultural lens, this movie should be a career-changing moment for Jobrani."

Awards

References

External links 
 
 
 
 

2014 films
American comedy films
Gay-related films
LGBT-related comedy films
2014 comedy films
Comedy films about Asian Americans
Iranian-American films
2014 LGBT-related films
2010s English-language films
2010s American films